A doom loop may be:

 In economics, a doom loop is a negative spiral that can result when banks hold sovereign bonds and governments bail out banks
 A climate doom loop occurs when consequences of climate change and the failure to address it draw focus and resources from tackling its root causes.